Blood Brothers is the second album from hip hop duo OuterSpace, released on September 5, 2006, by Babygrande Records. The album features guest appearances from Vinnie Paz of Jedi Mind Tricks, Sheek Louch and Royce da 5'9". The album's lead single is "Street Massacre" b/w "U Don't Like Me".

Track listing

2006 albums
OuterSpace albums
Babygrande Records albums